Marisa Boullosa (born 1961) is a Mexican artist.

Her work is included in the collections of the Musée national des beaux-arts du Québec, the Irish Museum of Modern Art, the Museum of New Zealand Te Papa Tongarewa, the National Gallery of Australia and the Museo Nacional de Artes Visuales, Uruguay.

Bibliography
 Lara, Lupina, Journal Abstract # 116, Compendium of Creators Mexico, in April 2012.
 Rosas Gonzalez, Blanca, "Border Wound, Images deportation”. Proceso Magazine, October 19, 2011.
 Swift, Edward. Boullosa wins Marisa Pollock / Krasner Grant, Newspaper Attention, October 8, 2010.
 Angeleschu, Victoria, "Nebanuita lume to gravurii¨, newspaper Adevarul, Romania, April 16, 2008.
 Ugalde, Lucia, "Migration, under the eyes of Marisa Boullosa, from Mi Tierra, published by the UNAM, November 2007.
 Nieves, Lillian, "Marisa Boullosa”, Trance Liquido, July 4, 2006, San Juan, Puerto Rico.
 Perez Rivera, Tatiana, "In the skin of an illegal, El Nuevo Dia, July 1, 2006, San Juan, Puerto Rico.
 Munoz, Miguel Angel, "Marisa Aesthetic Horizons Boullosa, written for Migrant exposure, Migrante USA, June 2006.

References

Living people
1961 births
20th-century Mexican women artists
21st-century Mexican women artists